Martin Henry Connolly (1874 – 8 August 1945) was a British politician and trade unionist.

Born in Newcastle-upon-Tyne, Connolly became an active trade unionist, and was elected to the General Council of the United Society of Boilermakers.  He was also active in local politics, and served as a Labour Party member of Newcastle City Council.

Connolly stood for Labour in Middlesbrough East at the 1922 general election, and again in 1923, but failed to win the seat.  However, at the 1924 general election, he switched to contest Newcastle-upon-Tyne East, winning the constituency.  He lost the seat at the 1929 general election, and did not stand again.

References

1874 births
1945 deaths
Councillors in Newcastle upon Tyne
Trade unionists from Newcastle upon Tyne
Labour Party (UK) MPs for English constituencies
Politicians from Newcastle upon Tyne
UK MPs 1924–1929
Labour Party (UK) councillors
United Society of Boilermakers-sponsored MPs